The 100s was a decade that ran from January 1, AD 100, to December 31, AD 109.

During this period, Roman Empire continued to expand its territory. Emperor Trajan, who ruled from 98 to 117 AD, launched several successful military campaigns, including the Dacian wars (101–106) and the possibly violent conquest of Nabataea (106). The conquest of Dacia in 106 secured its rich gold mines, and it is estimated that Dacia then contributed 700 million Denarii per annum to the Roman economy, providing finance for Rome's future campaigns and assisting with the rapid expansion of Roman towns throughout Europe. Furthermore, the conquest changed the balance of power in the region, leading to a renewed anti-Roman alliance of local Germanic and Celtic tribes. However, within the annexed territory and surrounds, the material advantages of being part of the Roman system wasn't lost on the majority of the surviving Dacian aristocracy. Thus began the process by which most modern Romanian historians and linguists believe that many of the Dacians subsequently became romanized (see Origin of Romanians). Alimenta, a Roman welfare program that had been initiated by Nerva in 98, continued to be in operation during this decade.

In East Asia, the Han dynasty saw a succession of rulers: Emperor He was succeeded by Emperor Shang in 106, who was succeeded by Emperor An that same year. However, the young emperor An did not rule in his own right, with Deng Sui instead being regent from 106 onwards. Deng Sui showed herself to be an able regent who did not tolerate corruption, even by her own family members. She also carried out criminal law reforms. For example, in 107, she issued an edict that extended the period for death penalty appeals. She cut the expenses of the royal court, like the making of expensive handicrafts such as jade and ivory carvings and sent home palace attendants with superfluous functions.  She also demanded less tribute from the provinces. While Empress, she twice opened the imperial granaries to feed the hungry; forced the reduction of income landlords received from the land they rented out; she repaired waterways and cut court rituals and banquets. She also saw rebellions from the South Xiongnu and Qiang, the latter of which would not be quelled until the next decade. In West Asia, Parthia saw a revolt by Osroes I against Pacorus II in 109. South America saw the emergence of the Moche culture.

Emperor Trajan corresponded with Pliny the Younger on the subject of how to deal with the Christians of Pontus. The theologian Edward Burton wrote that this correspondence shows there were no laws condemning Christians at that time. There was an "abundance of precedent (common law) for suppressing foreign superstitions" but no general law which prescribed "the form of trial or the punishment; nor had there been any special enactment which made Christianity a crime". Even so, Pliny implies that putting Christians on trial was not rare, and while Christians in his district had committed no illegal acts like robbery or adultery, Pliny "put persons to death, though they were guilty of no crime, and without the authority of any law" and believed his emperor would accept his actions. Trajan did, and sent back a qualified approval. He told Pliny to continue to prosecute Christians, but not to accept anonymous denunciations in the interests of justice as well as of "the spirit of the age". Non-citizens who admitted to being Christians and refused to recant, however, were to be executed "for obstinacy". Citizens were sent to Rome for trial. Mithraism, a Roman mystery religion viewed as a rival of early Christianity, had developed by this time.

Trajan invested heavily in the provision of popular amusements. He carried out a "massive reconstruction" of the Circus Maximus, which was already the Empire's biggest and best appointed circuit for the immensely popular sport of chariot racing. The Circus also hosted religious theatrical spectacles and games, and public processions on a grand scale. Trajan's reconstruction, completed by 103, was modestly described by Trajan himself as "adequate" for the Roman people. Furthermore, the decade saw the construction of Trajan's Bridge, the Baths of Trajan, and Roman roads such as Via Traiana and Via Traiana Nova. The Buddhacharita, a Sanskrit poem describing the birth and reign of the Third Mauryan Emperor Ashoka, was composed around this time. Plutarch wrote Parallel Lives, a series of 48 biographies of famous men, arranged in pairs to illuminate their common moral virtues or failings. Tacitus wrote Histories, which covers the history of Rome from 69 to 96. Juvenal wrote Satires, a collection of satirical poems. Furthermore, lions had become extinct in Greece by this period.

Significant people
 Trajan, Roman Emperor (AD 98–117)

References

Bibliography